Sir Adam Gibb Ellis was Chief Justice of Jamaica from 1884 to 1894.

References 

Chief justices of Jamaica
Year of birth missing
Knights Bachelor
Year of death missing
19th-century Jamaican judges